Tornod  is a village in Dhar district, Madhya Pradesh, India. Tornod is situated near State Highway 31.

References

Villages in Dhar district